Amanda Lamb (born 19 July 1972) is an English television presenter, property expert and former model who was notable for presenting A Place in the Sun from 2001 until 2009 and You Deserve This House. Lamb has also had notable appearances on various television programmes as a panellist or as a guest in shows such as The Games, Harry Hill's TV Burp and Pointless Celebrities.

Biography
Amanda Lamb was born in Portsmouth and was brought up in Havant, Hampshire. She now lives in London. She worked as an estate agent in Havant and part-time as a barmaid for five years before becoming a model. She is currently a television presenter.

Modelling
In 1994, she took over the role of the "Scottish Widow" from Deborah Moore in a long-running series of advertisements for the investment company, Scottish Widows Fund and Life Assurance Society. David Bailey once asked Lamb to glide across the screen wearing roller skates in a scene which never made the final cut. Lamb's final advert and her favourite was called "The Lighthouse", this contract lasted ten years.

In June 1998, she appeared in a silver bikini for FHM.

Television
In 2001, Lamb became the main presenter of the Channel 4 programme A Place in the Sun. She also presented "Hot Shots", an Epson-funded programme shown on Discovery Real Time about digital photography which was notable as being the last television appearance of photographer Patrick Lichfield.

She competed in the reality television show The Games in March 2006. Lamb then returned to filming A Place in the Sun, in which she still appears.
 
She co-hosted the cookery programme Market Kitchen (Good Food) and regularly appears on The Wright Stuff (Channel 5), also on Family Super Cooks (Watch).

In 2011 Lamb filmed the first of three series of My Flat-Pack Home for the Home Channel.  In March 2012, she began presenting You Deserve This House, a new Channel 4 daytime show in which the homes of 'community heroes' are secretly refurbished.

From 2014 to 2018, Lamb presented a prime time property show on More4 called Selling Houses with Amanda Lamb. On 20 August 2020, Lamb announced on Instagram that she would be presenting a new show called My Mortgage Free Home.

Her new series 'My Mortgage Free House' will air in 2023.

Personal life
Lamb married Mike Carter in 1998; they divorced in 2003. Lamb married cameraman Sean McGuinness at Babington House, Somerset, in 2012 and they have two daughters, Willow Rose (born in February 2009) and Lottie (born in July 2013).

In 2007, Lamb bought a flat in the medieval town of Nardò in the Apulia region, southern Italy.

Lamb has supported the charities Mind, Cancer Research and Shelter.

Filmography

Television

References

External links

Bio at Channel 4 Homes

1972 births
Living people
Mass media people from Hampshire
English female models
English television presenters
People from Havant